Orphanaspis is a poorly known genus of odontopleurid trilobite in the family Odontopleuridae.  The genus is originally based on poorly preserved material from the Wenlock-aged Motol Formation in Bohemia, Czech Republic, described by Joachim Barrande, in 1852, as "Trilobites orphana."  In 1945, Prantl and Pribyl reclassify T. orphana as Orphanaspis orphana.  Some experts suspect that O. orphana may actually be a species of Dicranurus.

References 

Odontopleuridae
Odontopleurida genera
Silurian trilobites of Europe